This is a list of operas specifically written for radio performance.

See also
Radio opera
 List of television operas

References
Notes

Sources

Radio
 
Operas
Operas